Strontium is a chemical element with symbol Sr and atomic number 38.

Strontium may also refer to:

 Strontium Technology, a Singaporean manufacturing company
 Strontium unit, a unit used to measure the amount of radioactivity from strontium-90
 STRONTIUM, a code name used by Microsoft for advanced persistent threat Fancy Bear

See also
 Strontium Dog, a British science fiction comic series
 Sr (disambiguation)
 Isotopes of strontium